Elections to Essex County Council took place on 6 May 2021 as part of the 2021 United Kingdom local elections. All 75 councillors were elected from 70 electoral divisions, with each returning either one or two councillors by first-past-the-post voting for a four-year term of office.

The electoral divisions were the same as those used at the previous elections in 2009, 2013 and 2017.

Previous composition

2017 election

Composition of council seats before election

Changes between elections

In between the 2017 election and the 2021 election, the following council seats changed hands:

Summary

Election result

|-

Election of Group Leaders

Kevin Bentley (Stanway and Pyefleet) was elected leader of the Conservative Group, with Louise McKinlay (Brentwood Hutton) as his deputy.

Michael Mackrory (Springfield) was re elected leader of the Liberal Democratic Group, with David King (Mile End and Highwoods) as his deputy.

Ivan Henderson (Harwich) was re elected leader of the Labour Group, with Adele Brown (Laindon Park & Fryerns) as his deputy.

Chris Pond (Loughton Central) was re elected leader of the Non-Aligned Group with Michael Hoy (Rochford West) as his deputy.

Election of Leader of the Council

Kevin Bentley the leader of the conservative group was duly elected leader of the council and formed a conservative administration.

Results by District

Basildon

District Summary

Division Results

Braintree

District Summary

Division Results

Brentwood

District Summary

Division Results

Castle Point

District Summary

Division Results

Chelmsford

District Summary

Division Results

Colchester

District Summary

Division Results

Epping Forest

District Summary

Division Results

Harlow

Division Results

Maldon

District Results

Division Results

Rochford

District Summary

Division Results

Tendring

District Summary

Division Results

Uttlesford

Division Summary

Division Results

Maps

Vote share by seat

By-elections

Rayleigh North

References

2021
2021 English local elections
2020s in Essex